Austrocnemis is a genus of damselflies belonging to the family Coenagrionidae.
Species of Austrocnemis are tiny, bronze-black damselflies with long legs.
They occur in New Guinea and Australia.

Species 
The genus Austrocnemis includes the following species:

Austrocnemis maccullochi 
Austrocnemis obscura  
Austrocnemis splendida

References

Coenagrionidae
Zygoptera genera
Odonata of Australia
Taxa named by Robert John Tillyard
Insects described in 1913
Damselflies